Nord-sud.com is a 2007 documentary film.

Synopsis 
The Internet has revolutionized the relations between people and continents. In Cameroon, it's a phenomenon: it has become some sort of El Dorado for young women from Cameroon who dream of helping their families thanks to a white husband. Josy, Sylvie and Mireille tried their luck at countless cybercafés in Yaoundé and live happily with their "whites" in Wallonia, Flanders and the Pyrenees. Others, like Natalie, weren't so lucky and had to go back home after a bad experience.

Awards 
 Festival International du Film Indépendant (Bruselas, 2008)

References 

2007 films
Belgian documentary films
French documentary films
2007 documentary films
Documentary films about the Internet
Internet in Africa
2000s French films